National Highway 727A, commonly referred to as NH 727A is a national highway in  India. It is a spur road of National Highway 27. NH-727A traverses the states of Bihar and Uttar Pradesh in India.

Route 
Uttar Pradesh
Gorakhpur, Deoria, Salempur - Bihar border.
Bihar
U.P. border - Mairwa.

Junctions  

  Terminal near Gorakhpur.
  Terminal near Mairwa.

See also 

 List of National Highways in India
 List of National Highways in India by state

References

External links 

 NH 727A on OpenStreetMap

National highways in India
National Highways in Bihar
National Highways in Uttar Pradesh